Monique Cerisier-ben Guiga (20 June 1942 – 9 May 2021) was a member of the Senate of France, representing French citizens living abroad.  She was a member of the Socialist Party.

References

Page on the Senate website

1942 births
2021 deaths
Socialist Party (France) politicians
French Senators of the Fifth Republic
Women members of the Senate (France)
Senators of French citizens living abroad
Lycée Pierre Mendès France (Tunisia) alumni
People from Sarthe
Politicians from Pays de la Loire
20th-century French women